Jacob Keith Thompson (born January 31, 1994) is an American professional baseball pitcher for the Leones de Yucatán of the Mexican League. He previously played in Major League Baseball (MLB) for the Philadelphia Phillies and for the Lotte Giants of the KBO League.

Career

Amateur career
Thompson attended Rockwall-Heath High School in Heath, Texas. There, in his senior year he was 12-3 with a 1.90 ERA and batted .504 with 15 home runs and 58 RBIs in 131 at bats, and Baseball America named him a First-Team High School All-American. He committed to attend Texas Christian University (TCU) on a college baseball scholarship to play for the TCU Horned Frogs baseball team. However, the Detroit Tigers selected Thompson in the second round of the 2012 MLB draft, and he signed with the Tigers for a $532,000 signing bonus.

Minor leagues

He made his professional debut for the Gulf Coast Tigers of the Rookie-level Gulf Coast League, recording six strikeouts over four innings with one hit allowed. He finished his first season 1–2 with a 1.91 earned run average (ERA) and 31 strikeouts over  innings in seven starts. Right-handed batters hit .125 against him.

Thompson played the 2013 season with the West Michigan Whitecaps of the Class A Midwest League. He pitched in 17 games with 16 starts, going 3–3 with a 3.13 ERA and 91 strikeouts in  innings. He started the 2014 season with the Lakeland Flying Tigers of the Class A-Advanced Florida State League. He was a mid-season Florida State League All Star. In July, Thompson played in the All-Star Futures Game, and was promoted to the Erie SeaWolves of the Class AA Eastern League.

On July 23, 2014, the Tigers traded Thompson and Corey Knebel to the Texas Rangers in exchange for reliever Joakim Soria. The Rangers assigned Thompson to the Frisco RoughRiders of the Class AA Texas League. After the 2014 season, MLB.com named him the 6th-best prospect in Texas's minor league system.

In 2015 he was a Texas League mid-season All-Star. On July 31, 2015, Thompson was traded to the Philadelphia Phillies along with Nick Williams, Jorge Alfaro, Alec Asher, Matt Harrison, and Jerad Eickhoff in exchange for Cole Hamels and Jake Diekman. Thompson pitched for the Reading Fightin Phils of the Class AA Eastern League. After the 2015 season, Baseball America him the 3rd-best prospect in the Phillies minor league system.

In 2016, Thompson pitched for the Lehigh Valley IronPigs of the Class AAA International League. He led the league with a 2.50 ERA and tied for the most wins with 11. He won the International League Most Valuable Pitcher Award. He was also named an International League Post-Season All Star, and Baseball America Triple-A All Star.

Philadelphia Phillies
Thompson received his MLB callup on August 6, 2016, as the starting pitcher against the San Diego Padres in a 9–7 loss. He earned his first MLB win on August 12, in a 10–6 victory over the Colorado Rockies at Citizens Bank Park. He also struck out four batters in the second inning of that game. Thompson finished his rookie season with a 3-6 record with a 5.70 ERA and 32 strikeouts over ten MLB starts.

During the 2017 season Thompson split time between the Phillies and Lehigh Valley, posting a 3-2 record with a 3.88 ERA and 35 strikeouts in 11 appearances (8 starts).

Thompson recorded his first MLB career save on April 8, 2018 against the Miami Marlins, pitching three scoreless innings to end a 20-1 blowout. Despite this performance, Thompson was optioned Triple-A immediately after the game. He was designated for assignment by the Phillies on August 10.

Milwaukee Brewers
The Phillies traded Thompson to the Milwaukee Brewers for cash considerations on August 14, and Milwaukee optioned him to the Colorado Springs Sky Sox of the Class AAA Pacific Coast League. He was designated for assignment on August 31, 2018. He was outrighted to AAA on September 3, 2018 and became a free agent after the season.

Lotte Giants
On December 13, 2018, Thompson signed a one-year, $900,000 contract with the Lotte Giants of the KBO League.

On June 9, 2019, he was released by the Giants.

Detroit Tigers (second stint)
On July 25, 2019, Thompson signed a minor-league contract with the Detroit Tigers. He became a minor league free agent on November 7, 2019.

Los Angeles Angels
On January 22, 2020, Thompson signed a minor league deal with the Los Angeles Angels. He became a free agent on November 2, 2020.

Leones de Yucatán
On May 25, 2021, Thompson signed with the Leones de Yucatán of the Mexican League.

See also
List of Major League Baseball single-inning strikeout leaders

References

External links

1994 births
Living people
American expatriate baseball players in the Dominican Republic
American expatriate baseball players in Mexico
American expatriate baseball players in South Korea
Baseball players at the 2015 Pan American Games
Baseball players from Texas
Colorado Springs Sky Sox players
Erie SeaWolves players
Frisco RoughRiders players
Gigantes del Cibao players
Gulf Coast Tigers players
KBO League pitchers
Lakeland Flying Tigers players
Lehigh Valley IronPigs players
Leones de Yucatán players
Leones del Escogido players
Lotte Giants players
Major League Baseball pitchers
Mexican League baseball pitchers
Pan American Games medalists in baseball
Pan American Games silver medalists for the United States
People from Heath, Texas
Philadelphia Phillies players
Reading Fightin Phils players
Sportspeople from the Dallas–Fort Worth metroplex
Toros del Este players
United States national baseball team players
West Michigan Whitecaps players
Medalists at the 2015 Pan American Games
Yaquis de Obregón players